Year 1344 (MCCCXLIV) was a leap year starting on Thursday (link will display the full calendar) of the Julian calendar.

Events 
 January–December 
 March 26 – Reconquista: The Siege of Algeciras (1342–44), one of the first European military engagements where gunpowder is used, ends with the Muslim city of Algeciras surrendering and being incorporated into the Kingdom of Castile.
 April 17 – Constantine II, King of Armenia, is killed in an uprising and succeeded by a distant cousin, Constantine III.
 April 23 – The St. George's Night Uprising: The Livonian Order hangs Vesse, the rebel Estonian Elder of Saaremaa Island.
 May 13 – Battle of Pallene: A Christian fleet defeats a Turkish fleet at Pallene, Chalcidice.
 October 24 – Smyrniote Crusade: A Christian fleet succeeds in taking the port city of Smyrna from the Aydinid Turks.
 December 6 – Five-year-old Erik Magnusson, the eldest son of King Magnus IV of Sweden, is appointed heir to the Swedish throne, even though Sweden is an elective monarchy at this time.

 Date unknown 
 King Edward III of England introduces three new gold coins, the florin, leopard, and helm. Unfortunately, the amount of gold in the coins does not match their value of 6 shillings, 3 shillings, and 1 shilling and sixpence, so they have to be withdrawn and mostly melted down, by August of this year.
 Bablake School is founded in Coventry, England by the dowager Queen Isabella.
 The Compagnia dei Bardi in Florence goes bankrupt, along with the Peruzzi Bank and the Acciaiuoli Bank.
 A large public dial clock is installed in the tower of the Palazzo Capitaniato, Padua, commissioned by Prince Ubertino I da Carrara and supervised by Jacopo Dondi dell'Orologio.
 A famine occurs in China.
 King Peter IV of Aragon defeats and deposes his cousin, James III of Majorca, thereby absorbing the Balearic Kingdom of Majorca into the Crown of Aragon.

Births 
 February 9 – Meinhard III, Count of Tyrol (d. 1363)
 September 18 – Marie Valois, French princess, daughter of King John II of France (d. 1404)
 October 10 – Mary Plantagenet, duchess consort of Brittany, daughter of King Edward III of England (d. 1362)
 date unknown
 Beatrix of Bavaria, queen consort of Sweden (d. 1359)
 Azzo X d'Este, Italian condottiero (d. 1415)
 John I, Count of La Marche (d. 1393)
 Parameswara, Malay Srivijayan prince (d. 1424)

Deaths 
 January 4 – Robert de Lisle, 1st Baron Lisle, English peer (b. 1288)
 January 11 – Thomas Charlton,  Bishop of Hereford, Lord High Treasurer of England, Lord Privy Seal, and Lord Chancellor of Ireland
 January 30 – William Montacute, 1st Earl of Salisbury (b. 1301)
 April 17 – Constantine II, King of Armenia (Gosdantin, Կոստանդին Բ)
 June 29 – Joan of Savoy, duchess consort of Brittany, throne claimant of Savoy (b. 1310)
 July 11 – Ulrich III, Count of Württemberg (b. c. 1286)
 July 16 – An-Nasir Ahmad, deposed Bahri Mamluk sultan of Egypt (b. 1316)
 date unknown
 Gersonides, French rabbi and mathematician (b. 1288)
 Raoul I of Brienne, Count of Eu
 Wajih ad-Din Mas'ud, leader of the Sarbadars of Sabzewar
 Prince Narinaga, Japanese Shōgun (b. 1326, d. either 1337 or 1344, the sources are contradictory).
 probable – Simone Martini, Sienese painter (b. 1284)

References